Robbie van Graan (24 August 1939 – 18 February 2014) was a South African cricketer. He played sixteen first-class matches for Western Province between 1972 and 1978.

References

External links
 

1939 births
2014 deaths
South African cricketers
Western Province cricketers
Cricketers from Cape Town